Annan was an  imperial protectorate and the southernmost administrative division of the Tang dynasty and Wu Zhou dynasty of China from 679 to 866, located in modern-day Vietnam. An Nam, simplified to "Annam", is the Vietnamese form of the Chinese name Annan, which means "the Pacified South" or "to pacify the South", a clipped form of the full name, the "Protectorate General to Pacify the South".

In 679, the Annan Protectorate replaced the Jiaozhou Protectorate, also known as Jiaozhi, with its seat situated in Songping County (modern Hanoi). Annan was renamed to Zhennan for a brief period from 757 to 760 before reverting to Annan.

After coming under attack by Nanzhao in 864, the Annan Protectorate was renamed Jinghai Military Command upon its reconquest by Gao Pian in 866. Today the same area is sometimes known as Tonkin, the "eastern capital" of Đại Việt.

History

Predecessors

The territory was conquered for the Qin dynasty by Zhao Tuo after the death of Qin Shi Huang. In the chaos surrounding the Chu–Han Contention, he declared its independence as Nanyue and ruled from Panyu (modern Guangzhou). Jiaozhou was the Han dynasty country subdivision formed from the annexation of this tributary kingdom in 111 BCE and it initially comprised the areas of modern Guangdong, Guangxi, and northern Vietnam.

During the Three Kingdoms era, Eastern Wu split from Liangguang as Guangzhou in 222 CE. Tang rule in northern Vietnam began in 622 after Qiu He, the Chinese warlord recognized Tang authority.

Tang Protectorate
 
In 624 the Tang dynasty created the Jiaozhou Protectorate. In 627 the Jiaozhou Protectorate was put under the administration of Lingnan Circuit. In 679, the Annan Protectorate replaced the Jiaozhou Protectorate and was seated in Songping County in present day Hanoi. The Annan Protectorate was renamed Zhennan Protectorate in 757. It was changed back to Annan Protectorate in 760. The Annan Protectorate came under attack from Nanzhao in 846 and the conflict lasted until 866, after which the Jinghai Army Jiedushi was created.

List of notable events

In 676, jiedushi and governors of Guangxi, Guangdong and Jiaozhou established a method of selecting local men for administrative positions. Every four years, the "southern selection" would choose aboriginal chiefs to be appointed to fill positions of the fifth degree and above. Taxation was more moderate than within the empire proper; the harvest tax was one-half the standard rate, an acknowledgement of the political problems inherent in ruling a non-Chinese population.

In 687, the new governor of Annan, Liu Yanyou doubled the taxes. The indigenous peasants under chief Lý Tự Tiên resisted. Liu Yanyou killed Lý. Đinh Kiến, one of Lý's compatriots, led the people against Yanyou and besieged him in Songping. In the summer, the rebels took Songping and put Yanyou to death. A governor general, Feng Yuanchang, had earlier been called in to help Liu, but Feng hoped to gain influence at Liu's expense and did nothing to help him. Instead Feng established a fortified camp and sent envoys to the rebels telling them to kill their leader and join him. After Liu was killed, Feng abandoned Annan. Another general, Cao Xuanjing, marched into Annan, put down the rebellion, and executed Đinh Kiến.

In 722, Mai Thúc Loan rebelled in what is now Hà Tĩnh Province and proclaimed himself the "Swarthy Emperor" or "Black Emperor" (Hắc Đẽ). His rebellion rallied people from 23 counties with "400,000 followers". Many were peasants who roamed the countryside, plundering food and other items. He also allied with Champa and Chenla, an unknown kingdom named Jinlin (“Gold Neighbor”) and other unnamed kingdoms. A Chinese army of 100,000 from Guangdong under general Yang Zixu, including a "multitude" of mountain tribesmen who had remained loyal to the Tang, marched directly along the coast, following the old road built by Ma Yuan. Yang Zixu attacked Mai Thúc Loan by surprise and suppressed the rebellion in 723. The corpses of the Swarthy Emperor and his followers were piled up to form a huge mound and were left on public display to check further revolts.

In 767, a Javanese raiding fleet invaded Annan, besieging Songping, but were defeated by Tang marquis Zhang Boyi. In 785, chieftains of the Annamese, Đỗ Anh Hàn, Phùng Hưng and Phùng An rebelled, due to Chinese governor Gao Zhengping's doubling of taxes. Tang forces retook Annan in 791.

In 803, a northern state of Champa, Huanwang, seized southern Annan. Tang troops working on garrison fortifications also revolted. From 803 to 863, local rebels killed or expelled no fewer than six protector-generals of Annan. In 820, Dương Thanh (Yang Qing) rebelled, seized Đại La, and killed the protectorate general. Dương Thanh was unpopular due to his cruelty and put to death by the locals soon after, however the region continued to experience disorders for the next 16 years.

From 823 to 826, the Nung people (Huang people), aided by raiders from Champa, attacked Yongzhou and seized 18 counties. These raiders, known as the barbarians of the "Nung Grottoes" (Yellow Grotto Barbarians), sought aid from Nanzhao after the Tang retaliated from 827-835. In 845, governor Wu Hun tried to get his troops to rebuild the city walls of Songping but they rebelled and forced him to flee. The rebellion was put down. In 846 "barbarians" from Yunnan (Nanzhao) raided Annan. The new governor Pei Yuanyu counterattacked with soldiers from neighboring provinces.

Rebellion, invasion, and renaming

In 854, the new Jiedushi of Annan, Li Zhuo, provoked hostility with the mountain tribes by prohibiting the salt trade and killing powerful chieftains, resulting in the defection of prominent local leaders to Nanzhao. The general Lý Do Độc, as well as others, submitted to Nanzhao. In 858, Nanzhao invaded Annan while new jiedushi, Li Hu, killed the son of a chieftain who was implicated in a mutiny, further alienating powerful clans in Annan and causing them to defect to Nanzhao. While Nanzhao invaded in earnest, the Đỗ clan rebelled with 30,000 men. Then in early 863, Nanzhao and tribal allies took Songping after a bitter siege. There was general chaos as Nanzhao ravaged Annan, alienating the locals, and the balance of power see-sawed between Tang and Nanzhao forces. In 864, the experienced Tang general, Gao Pian, led a counterattack that saw the defeat of Nanzhao forces in 866. He recaptured Songping, the capital of Annan, and named the rebuilt capital Đại La. He also renamed the region of Annan to Jinghai Jun (lit. Peaceful Sea Army).

Aftermath
The Tang conducted a campaign against local tribes in Annan in 874-879. In 877, troops deployed from Annan in Guangxi mutinied. In 880, the army in Annan mutinied, taking the city of Đại La, and forced the military commissioner Zeng Gun to flee north, ending de facto Chinese control in Northern Vietnam.

List of governors

Protectorate governors 
Protectorate governors (都護) are civilian governors of the Protectorate. Military administration is held by Jiedushi (Military commissioner). During rebellion and wartime, the two position can be held by the same person.
Liu Yanyou 劉延祐 681–687
Yang Min 楊敏 (During Wu Zetian's reign)
Cui Xuanxin 崔玄信 (During Wu Zetian's reign)
Guang Chuke 光楚客
Xin Ziyan 辛子言
He Lüguang 何履光 749–751
Wang Zhijin 王知進
Kang Qian 康謙
Dou Meng 竇蒙
Chao Heng 晁衡 (aka Abe no Nakamaro) 761–767
Zhang Boyi 張伯儀 767–777
Wu Chongfu 烏崇福 777–782
Li Mengqiu 李孟秋 782
Fu Liangjiao 輔良交 782–785
Zhang Ying 張應 788
Pang Fu 龐復 789
Gao Zhengping 高正平 790–791
Zhao Chang 趙昌 791–802
Pei Tai 裴泰 802–803
Zhao Chang 804–806
Zhang Zhou 張舟 806–810
Ma Zong 馬總 810–813
Zhang Mian 張勔 813
Pei Xingli 裴行立 813–817
Li Xianggu 李象古 817–819 - killed by Yang Qing, who rebelled and killed by Gui Zhongwu
Gui Zhongwu 桂仲武 819–820
Pei Xingli 820
Gui Zhongwu 820–822
Wang Chengbian 王承弁 822
Li Yuanxi 李元喜 822–826
Han Yue 韓約 827–828
Zheng Chuo 鄭綽 831
Liu Min 劉旻 833
Han Wei 韓威 834
Tian Zao 田早 835
Ma Zhi 馬植 836–840
Wu Hun 武渾 843
Pei Yuanyu 裴元裕 846–847
Tian Zaiyou 田在宥 849–850
Cui Geng 崔耿 852
Li Zhuo 李琢 853–855
Song Ya 宋涯 857
Li Hongfu 李弘甫 857–858
Wang Shi 王式 858–860 (military Jinglueshi) 
Li Hu 李鄠 860–861
Wang Kuan 王寬 861–862
Cai Xi 蔡襲 862–863 (military Jinglueshi) 
Song Rong 宋戎 863 (de jure Jinglueshi, Annam invaded by Nanzhao)
Zhang Yin 張茵 864 (de jure Jinglueshi, Annam invaded by Nanzhao)

Culture and religion

During the era of the Annan Protectorate, the indigenous people living within its jurisdiction had no particular name. They were referred to in Chinese writing as the Wild Man (Wild Barbarians), the Li or the Annamese. Since antiquity the peoples of Northern Vietnam had been noted for their common tattooing and cropped hair, wearing line ponchos, wielded wooden spears, and shot boneheaded arrows. They also sacrificed men to their agricultural gods. In the north, around Yongzhou (Nanning), near modern-day Guangxi, mountains were the territories of the Huang (Ghwang) people or the "Grotto Barbarians", the Nùng people and the Ning clans.

Revival of direct Tang control over Annan for two centuries resulted in a hybrid Tang-indigenous culture, political and legal structures. Local sinicized elites used Chinese script, and ordinary people and tribesmen adopted personal names and name styles that corresponding to Vietnamese personal names until now. A large number of Chinese officers and soldiers were sent to Annan, some of whom married local women and settled down. Buddhism thrived in Annan throughout the Tang era. Some of Chinese monks came and taught Chinese Buddhism in Annan. Wu Yantong (d. 820), a prominent Chinese monk in Annan, brought a new sect of Chan Buddhism that survived for about five centuries. Local women had large roles and status in religious life and society. Vietnamese temples and monasteries differed with Chinese and other East Asian countries in their role as the đình, the village spiritual center, where village elders met. The famous Tang Chinese monk Yijing mentioned six Vietnamese monks who went on pilgrimage to India and Ceylon in search of the Dharma. Although Daoism became the dynasty's official religion, four prominent Tang poets praised Buddhist masters who hailed from Annan. Indigenous Confucianist scholarly elites remained very relatively small. In 845, a Tang official reported to the throne that "Annan has produced no more than eight imperial officials; senior graduates have not exceeded ten." Liêu Hữu Phương was the only recorded student from Annan to have passed the classical exams in 816 in the Tang capital of Chang'an. He succeeded on his second attempt and became a librarian at the imperial court.

Population

See also
Protectorate General to Pacify the East (Andong) 
Protectorate General to Pacify the West (Anxi) 
Southward expansion of the Han dynasty
History of Vietnam
Administrative divisions of the Tang dynasty

References

Bibliography

 
 

Former provinces of China
Former countries in Vietnamese history
Military history of the Tang dynasty
Former commanderies of China in Vietnam
679 establishments
860s disestablishments
7th century in China
8th century in China
9th century in China
7th century in Vietnam
8th century in Vietnam
9th century in Vietnam
Administrative divisions of the Tang dynasty